The Pusading is a Buddhist temple located in Taihuai Town of Wutai County, Shanxi, China. The temple structure is considered the best of all temples in Mount Wutai.

History
The legend says that Manjushri revealed himself and preached at the summit of Mount Wutai, hence the name "Bodhisattva Summit Temple". It is also known as "Spiritual Black Eagle Peak" due to its geographical position similar to the Lingjiu Peak described by Sakyamuni in the city of Rajgir northeast of the Kingdom of Magadha.

Northern Wei dynasty
Pusading was first established in the reign of Emperor Xiaowen of Northern Wei (467–499) in the Northern Wei (386–534) dynasty and initially called "Great Temple of Manjushri".

Tang dynasty
In 631, in the 5th year of the Zhenguan period of the Tang dynasty (618–907), Buddhist monk Fayun rebuilt the temple and renamed it "Zhenrong Temple".

Song dynasty
During the Jingde period (1004–1007) of the Northern Song dynasty (960-1127), Emperor Zhenzong (997–1022) bestowed a plaque with "Fengzhen Pavilion" on the temple.

Ming dynasty
In the Yongle period (1403–1424) of the Ming dynasty (1368–1644), the Yongle Emperor changed the name to "Great Temple of Manjushri". In 1581, in the 9th year of the Wanli period, the temple was renovated by the government.

Qing dynasty
In 1656, in the 13th year of the Shunzhi period (1644–1661) of the Qing dynasty (1644–1912), the temple converted to Tibetan Buddhism. In 1683, in the 22nd year of the Kangxi period (1662–1722), with the Kangxi Emperor's permission, the roof of Pusading was tiled with yellow glazed tiles.

In June 1908, United States Ambassador to China William Woodville Rockhill and the 13th Dalai Lama talked about strengthening cooperation on the Government of British India and Government of Tibet issue in the temple.

Republic of China
In the spring of 1948, Chen Yi went to Xibaipo via Mount Wutai. He wrote a poem in praise of the beautiful scenery.

People's Republic of China
In 1983, the temple was classified as a "National Key Buddhist Temple in Han Chinese Area".

Architecture

A walkway of 108 stone steps
A walkway of 108 stone steps leads to the summit as if it was a ladder to heaven from the temples below. It is said the 108 stone steps represent 108 worries of mankind, and one has to overcome them one step (one worry) at a time to see the true capacity of Buddha.

Paifang
Under the paifang of shanmen is a plaque with the Chinese characters "" ( means beautiful site of Lingjiu Peak) written by the Kangxi Emperor (1654–1722) in the Qing dynasty (1644–1912).

In front of Manjusri Hall, a plaque with "" ( means beautiful site of Mount Wutai), written by the Kangxi Emperor (1654–1722) in the Qing dynasty (1644–1912), is hung on the stone paifang.

References

Bibliography
 

Buddhist temples on Mount Wutai
Tibetan Buddhist temples in Shanxi
Gelug monasteries and temples
Wutai County
Xinzhou